Belgaum Airport , also known as Belagavi Airport, is a domestic airport serving Belagavi, Karnataka. The current integrated terminal building was inaugurated by the then Minister of Civil Aviation, Ashok Gajapathi Raju on 14 September 2017. Near the airport, there is an Indian Air Force station, where new recruits receive basic training.

History
Built in 1942 by the Royal Air Force (RAF), Belgaum Airport is the third oldest airport in Karnataka. The RAF used the airport as a training site during World War II, providing support to the South East Asia Command. The Directorate General of Civil Aviation (DGCA) took control of the airport in 1956, followed by the Ministry of Civil Aviation in 1962. During the 1990s, Belgaum Airport was served by East-West Airlines, Gujarat Airways, Indian Airlines, NEPC Airlines and Vayudoot. All airlines ended flights to the airport by the end of the decade.

Belgaum Airport saw the return of commercial flights in 2003, with Air Deccan providing service from Bangalore. Air Deccan also flew to Kolhapur and Mumbai for some time. After Air Deccan completed its merger with Kingfisher Airlines in 2008, Kingfisher decided to end flights to Belgaum in June 2009. Nevertheless, expansion plans for Belgaum Airport were launched in 2010, when the Airports Authority of India (AAI) and the Government of Karnataka signed a memorandum of understanding. Kingfisher returned in January 2011 with daily flights from Mumbai, but it exited the market in November 2011 amid its own financial difficulties. SpiceJet arrived at Belgaum in November 2012 with flights from Bangalore and later added direct flights to Chennai, Mumbai, Hyderabad after Belgaum airport was expanded in September 2017. Spicejet served the airport till May 2018.After Hubballi airport was nominated under UDAN scheme. Spicejet shifted all its operations to Hubballi which it operated from Belgaum Airport, Airport came into operation again after Alliance Air, a subsidiary of Air India began flight services to Bangalore from 11 July 2018. This was a thrice a week flight operated by ATR 72 type aircraft. Air India began service to Bangalore with its Airbus A319 aircraft from 10 August 2018 on remaining 4 days of the week thus connecting Belgaum with Bangalore all 7 days in the week. Also this was the first arrival of Airbus A319 in Belgaum.

In 2013, the Central Government cleared the expansion project. Work began in February 2015 at a cost of Rs 1.20 billion and took over two and a half years. It involved extension of the runway, construction of a new isolation bay, taxiway, apron for three A-320 aircraft and a new 22.5-metre tall ATC tower. The expanded facilities were formally inaugurated on 14 September 2017 and AAI commissioned the new terminal and apron on 16 October 2017.

In 2020, Union Minister of State for Railways Suresh Angadi requested that the airport be named after Kittur Rani Chennamma.

Terminal and airfield

A new terminal building was inaugurated on 14 September 2017 as part of the airport expansion project. The terminal building is spread over 3,600 square metres and has a capacity to accommodate over 300 passengers. It has two baggage conveyor belts and six check-in counters. It has an apron for parking of three Airbus A320 and Boeing 737 aircraft. The old apron has two parking stands designed for the ATR 72 and similar aircraft. There are also two additional aprons, one on the north side of the runway that serves as an isolation bay and one on the south side. These aprons are each connected by single taxiways to runway 08/26, which measures . A  extension of the runway has been completed & presently runway size is 2300×45 metres.

Airlines and destinations

Statistics

Air Force Station
Built by and originally under the control of the Royal Air Force, the Special Reserve Police of Karnataka took over the airbase in 1948. The air force station was a major base of air operations during Operation Vijay in 1961. Two years later, No. 1 Ground Training School at Jalahalli was moved to the base and renamed Administrative Training Institute (ATI) in 1980. In 2001, the ATI was renamed Airmen Training School (ATS). The focus of the base turned to providing Joint Basic Phase Training (JBPT) through the Basic Training Institute. JBPT is designed to teach recruits military values and orient them towards a life in the military.

See also
 List of airports in Karnataka

References

External links
 Belagavi Airport at Airports Authority of India website.

Airports in Karnataka
Transport in Belgaum
Buildings and structures in Belagavi district
1942 establishments in British India
Airports established in 1942
20th-century architecture in India